The 1951–52 season was Port Vale's 40th season of football in the English Football League, and their seventh full season in the Third Division South. Manager Ivor Powell did not last long, and was replaced by Freddie Steele in December. Steele would later prove to be one of the club's greatest and longest serving managers. He started early, taking a club bottom of the league at Christmas to a thirteenth-place finish. He achieved this without making any major signings, rather he managed the players he had in a better way than Powell.

From 9 February until 8 September the following season the club racked up a club record streak of twelve consecutive home wins.

Overview

Third Division South
The pre-season saw 578 seats installed on the Railway Terrace, bringing the seated capacity of Vale Park to 1,010. No signings of note were made, however transfer-listed Cliff Pinchbeck failed to turn up for pre-season training, citing illness.

Thirty seconds into their opening game with Reading and they were behind, the Vale went on to lose 2–0. A six-game unbeaten streak followed, with just three goals conceded, though only five goals were scored. On his return to Burslem, Pinchbeck scored a brace to salvage a point against Bournemouth & Boscombe Athletic. Vale then sold Alan Martin to rivals Stoke City for £10,000 and Albert Mullard, the money going towards fixing the drainage problem at Vale Park. The sale was criticized by supporters, though they soon warmed to Mullard, who went on to become the club's top-scorer. The club failed to sign transfer target Dennis Wilshaw from Wolverhampton Wanderers, and Garth Butler was forced to retire with a knee injury. Results turned against the team, as they went on a run of thirteen games without a win, though all five of the home games on the 'wide open' Vale Park pitch were draws (all eight away matches were losses). Manager Ivor Powell attempted to sign players, but was deterred by the high transfer prices, and so instead continually reshuffled the first eleven. Powell's contract was terminated on 22 November, his team bottom of the table. Trainer Ken Fish took temporary charge of first team affairs. Roy Sproson and Ray King would later say the sacking came as no surprise, saying Powell 'ruled by fear', 'used to treat the players like kids' and it was a 'complete relief' to find him dismissed. Pinchbeck was also offloaded, sold to Northampton Town for 'an undisclosed sum'.

On 8 December, Vale recorded a surprise 4–1 win over Aldershot. Yet the side then went another eight games without a win. Freddie Steele was appointed player-manager on Christmas Eve, signing the former England international meant Vale had to pay Mansfield Town a four-figure fee. The former Stoke City forward was still very much a goalscorer, having described his record of 44 goals in 66 games for the "Stags" as "not bad for an old man!". In January, half-back Norman Hallam returned to the club. On 12 January, 17,860 turned up to witness a 1–1 draw in Steele's debut against second-placed Brighton & Hove Albion, the first of a five match unbeaten run that took Vale off the foot of the table. A fortnight later Vale travelled to Plainmoor, where Steele took the ball from his own half to score the winner past Torquay United. On 9 February, Vale beat Gillingham 1–0, in what was the first of a club record thirteen game winning run at home.

A 5–1 hammering at Elm Park from Reading failed to prevent the Vale from going on to another eight game unbeaten run. Steele accomplished this without any new signings, in fact he sold Walter Aveyard to Accrington Stanley for a four-figure fee in April. Their run ended with a 3–0 defeat at Fellows Park to bottom-placed Walsall. Vale finished their final five games with three wins.

They finished thirteenth with 43 points, with a strong defence but the lowest goals scored tally in the division. They had lost just the one game at Vale Park, back on the opening day.

Finances
On the financial side, a profit of £4,403 was announced by the club, due to a profit on transfers of £16,750. Gross receipts had fallen to £27,133, whilst wages had risen by £3,500 to £23,511. Steele seemed to be happy with the players he inherited, as he retained 31 professionals, the only departures being George Heppell to Witton Albion, Stan Palk to Worcester City, and Lol Hamlett to Congleton Town.

Cup competitions
In the FA Cup, Vale fell at the first hurdle to Colchester United at Layer Road, losing 3–1.

League table

Results
Port Vale's score comes first

Football League Third Division South

Results by matchday

Matches

FA Cup

Player statistics

Appearances

Top scorers

Transfers

Transfers in

Transfers out

References
Specific

General

Port Vale F.C. seasons
Port Vale